Some & Any was a German pop duo, formed during the eighth season of the German television talent show Popstars. The group consisted of then-18-year-old Vanessa Meisinger and 20-year-old half-Brazilian, half-Swiss Leonardo Ritzmann. The season finale aired on 10 December 2009.

History

Formation on Popstars
Open castings, searching for a duo, took place in Stuttgart, Düsseldorf, Munich, and Berlin. The decision-show ("Bewährungsshow") took place in Stuttgart on 27 September 2009. The chosen contestants flew to Las Vegas for the show's workshop, took a road trip through the United States to New York City, where the band phase took place. 

After these steps, the few contestants left were arranged in duos. Henceforth, the contestants could just win or lose as a duo. Vanessa and Leo performed with Culcha Candela, recording their song "Monsta" live. This live recording was released as official remix. At the finale, the contestants performed with Leona Lewis and Rihanna. During the finale, the viewers decided by telephone voting that Vanessa and Leo formed the winners of the eighth Popstars season.

2009-2010: First Shot
The band's debut album First Shot was released 18 December 2009. Besides the debut single, the album included songs that were previously performed by contestants during the pre-finale rounds. The debut single itself was released 11 December and also contains versions of the song recorded by eliminated contestants Elif & Nik and Dagmara & Daniel.

Both debuts—the single "Last Man Standing" and the album First Shot—charted at the worst position in the history of Popstars. The second single, "Too Perfect", was released in March 2010.

In April 2010, it was stated that their record deal was not renewed, leaving the duo terminated.

Discography

Studio albums

Singles

References

External links

 someandany.de – official website

German pop music groups
Popstars winners
German musical duos
Pop music duos
Male–female musical duos